Borsheims is a luxury jewelry store that sells fine jewelry, timepieces, engagement rings and home decór in Omaha, Nebraska.  In 1870, Norwegian immigrant and silversmith Louis Borsheims founded his independent jewelry business that would later become known as Borsheims. The luxury jewelry retailer began as Brown and Borsheim. In 1907, Louis A. Borsheim sold his interests in Brown and Borsheim, thus began the Omaha staple, Borsheims. The business was sold to Louis Friedman and Simon Gorelick in 1947.  In 1950, Louis bought out his brother in law, Simon Gorelick and  his son Ike joined the business, who both retained the Borsheims name. In 1980, Ike Friedman bought out his father, Louis.  Ike's son Alan and son in law joined the business.  In 1985, his other son in law, Donald Yale joined the business.  His two daughters, Janis Yale and Susie Cohn also worked in the business.  It was, truly, a family business.  

In 1986, Borsheims moved to the Regency Court Mall. In 1989, investor Warren Buffett purchased a majority of Borsheims stock, making it part of his holding company, Berkshire Hathaway.  Ike Friedman died in 1991 and Donald Yale was named President and CEO.  Alan Friedman left the business.  Donald Yale served in that post until he retired in 1994.  Susan Jacques was named his successor.

Borsheims is now led by Karen Goracke, who became Borsheims president and CEO in 2013. The store maintains an inventory that includes more than 50,000 pieces of jewelry and watches.

It has been the location of Berkshire shareholder-only events held in association with its annual general meeting.

References

External links
 Borsheims

Berkshire Hathaway
Companies based in Omaha, Nebraska